Stefan Kurt (born 22 October 1959 in Bern) is a Swiss actor. He attended the University of the Arts Bern before pursuing a professional acting career. He performed on stage as well as in more than fifty films since 1993.

Selected filmography

External links
 

1959 births
Living people
Swiss male stage actors
Swiss male film actors
Swiss male television actors
People from Bern
20th-century Swiss male actors
21st-century Swiss male actors